K36NN-D, virtual channel 38 (UHF digital channel 36), is a low-powered religious television station licensed to West Plains, Missouri, United States. The station is owned by Promised Land Ministries. It covers parts of southern Missouri and north-central Arkansas. It is also seen on Fidelity Communications (channel 8) in West Plains and in Thayer, Missouri and Mammoth Spring, Arkansas (channel 18).

It carries local and nationally known programming from noon through 6am daily and network programming from 6am until noon from TCT. Operations are supported by donations from loyal viewers.

In 2009, a severe thunderstorm late on the evening of July 11 seriously damaged the new  radio tower at its new TV studio, which holds the microwave-band dish antenna for the studio/transmitter link. In use for less than two weeks, it was made necessary because of a move in the studio location further away from the TV transmitter site, making the cost of leasing a much longer fiber-optic line than before prohibitive.

K38HE went off the air couple of times after a transmitter tube broke in the transmitter and returned to the air on October 9, 2009. However, this was short-lived. On Monday night September 21, 2009, K38HE went off the air after a tube broke in the transmitter. This station has returned to the air on Monday night October 19, 2009. K38HE went off the air after a rebuilt tube broke in the transmitter. K38HE has replaced the transmitter with a new tube and returned to the air on October 23, 2009.

Digital television

Digital channels
The station's signal is multiplexed:

Analog-to-digital conversion
K38HE, on December 9, 2014, has completed the required transition to digital broadcasting.

Local programming
Community Calendar: A program that tells whats going on around southern Missouri and north-central Arkansas.
General Store/Community Calendar: Viewers can call in and buy items that are being shown for donations. All donations help support the station.
The Calling
Forgiven with Velma Childers
Ed Carter Ministries
For Such a Time As This with Sarah George
Joanie Buchanan Ministries
Inside Channel 38
Fire Desire
Yours For a Song with Dan Duncan
OMC Hospice
The Hour of Vision
The Evangelist with Robby Mitchell
Charles Nichols & Friends
Ozark Tradition with Carl Trantham and Friends
From Our Hearts with Richie (the Mule Jump Preacher) & Carolyn DeMent
Vetrice Earith
Rhonda Spreutels
The Bottom Line
Growing in Grace with Brenda Mantooth
Grace Revealed with Apostle Peter Barnes
Holiness Unto the Lord with Pat Ward
Arnold Wade
Central Calvary Baptist Church
Eastgate Ministries
The Voice of Breakthrough
1st Baptist Church of West Plains
True Connection
Generation Now
The Kevin Shorey Show

References

Television channels and stations established in 2005
2005 establishments in Missouri
Low-power television stations in the United States
36NN-D
Religious television stations in the United States